Leopold Bode (12 September 1894 – 7 October 1985) was an Austrian footballer. He played in two matches for the Austria national football team in 1914.

References

External links
 

1894 births
1985 deaths
Austrian footballers
Austria international footballers
Place of birth missing
Association football goalkeepers
Wiener AF players